The 2000 CricInfo Women's Cricket World Cup was an international cricket tournament played in New Zealand from 29 November to 23 December 2000. It was the seventh edition of the Women's Cricket World Cup, and the second to be hosted by New Zealand, after the 1982 tournament.

The World Cup was organised by the International Women's Cricket Council (IWCC), with matches played over 50 overs. New Zealand defeated Australia by four runs in the final, winning their first and only title. India and South Africa were the losing semi-finalists, while the other four teams were England, Sri Lanka, Ireland, and the Netherlands. Two Australians, Karen Rolton and Charmaine Mason, led the tournament in runs and wickets, respectively, while another Australian, Lisa Keightley, was named player of the tournament. The tournament was sponsored by CricInfo, a cricket website, which allowed the tournament to receive ball-by-ball text commentary coverage, as well as streamed audio and video, a first for women's cricket.

Squads

Round-robin

Points table

Matches

Knockout stage

Semi finals

Final

Statistics

Most runs
The top five run-scorers are included in this table, ranked by runs scored, then by batting average, then alphabetically by surname.

Source: ESPNcricinfo

Most wickets

The top five wicket-takers are listed in this table, ranked by wickets taken and then by bowling average.

Source: ESPNcricinfo

References

External links
 Series home at ESPN Cricinfo

 
2000
2000 in women's cricket
International women's cricket competitions in New Zealand
2000 in New Zealand cricket
cricket
November 2000 sports events in New Zealand
December 2000 sports events in New Zealand